Paul Sibra (10 September 1889 – 24 March 1951) was a French regionalist painter, painter of religious scenes, landscapes and portraits.

Paul Sibra is nicknamed “le peintre du Lauragais”, after his native region.

Biography 

Paul Sibra was born in 1889 in Castelnaudary in a well of family of fabric shopkeepers. After 4 years of training before and after First World War in the Académie Julian of Paris (his master was Jean-Paul Laurens), Sibra travelled in France, Belgium, Tunisia and later in Italy, creating many travel sketchbooks on the way. Following the Great War, Paul Sibra was part of the general movement called “return to order”, that rejected the excesses of the avant-garde and encouraged a revival of classicism and realistic painting. Participating to the Salon’s exhibitions, he spent some years living between Paris and Castelnaudary, before he turned back for good to his beloved Lauragais, in the Castelnaudary area at the end of the 1920s.
 
Sibra was close to the félibrige movement and he built his fame portraying defenders of the occitanian culture and language such as poets, writers and actors. During the 1930s, he had some success as a portraitist for military and clergy men. Through the same period, he started to document and paint Lauragais villages and rural landscapes. His masterpiece is a large landscape, with scenes of agricultural work, that can be understood as an allegory of "nurturing earth", alluding to the reputed abundant agricultural production of Lauragais (The Lauragais, 1929).

Early in his career, Sibra’s ambition of documenting the Lauragais countryside and everyday life led him to create a corpus of thousands of drawings along with notes, compiled in sketchbooks. This methodical survey, even if uncompleted, is an extremely valuable document for our understanding of the Lauragais rural life of mid-twentieth Century, before the definitive mechanization of farming practices.

Paul Sibra died of a heart attack in 1951 at the age of 62. He left over 1,500 paintings and several thousands of drawings.

See also 

 Lauragais

Further reading 

 Fourès Auguste, Art des potiers et manières de table, with illustrations by P. Sibra, La Rochelle, La Découvrance, 2007.
 Jeux sornettes d’enfants de Paul Sibra (1889-1951) extraits du cahier « Du Berceau à la tombe », exhibition catalogue, Musée Calbet (16 April-23 May 2010), Grisolles, 2010.
 Paul Sibra, peintre de langue d’oc, exhibition catalogue, Musée des Beaux-Arts de Carcassonne (1 April-9 June 1992) and Musée d’Art et d’Histoire de Narbonne (18 juin-27 septembre 1992), B. Jeanjean-Marty and J. Lepage ed., Narbonne, 1992.

References 

People from Castelnaudary
1889 births
1951 deaths
20th-century French painters
20th-century French male artists
French male painters